The School for Good and Evil is a fantasy fairytale hexalogy of books by Soman Chainani. The first novel in the series was published on May 14, 2013. The series is set in a fictional widespread location known as the Endless Woods. The original trilogy (known as The School Years) follows the adventures of best friends Sophie and Agatha at the School for Good and Evil, an enchanted institution where children are trained to become fairytale heroes or villains, respectively. The second trilogy (The Camelot Years) follows Agatha and her true love King Tedros  ascending to the role of Queen and King of the legendary kingdom, Camelot, and Sophie re-forming Evil into a new image. The final book in the original series was released on June 2, 2020, with the first book in a prequel series debuting in 2022. A film adaptation by Netflix was released on October 19, 2022.

Summary

The School Years

Premise 
Every four years, two children are kidnapped from the village of Gavaldon. Usually, one child is well-behaved and beautiful, and the other is ugly and peculiar. The kidnapper, referred to as "the School Master", allegedly kidnaps them to the School for Good and Evil in the surrounding Endless Woods, where they are trained to become fairytale heroes and villains.

==== The School for Good & Evil (2013) ====

Beautiful and pink-loving Sophie dreams of attending the School for Good and finding true love. Meanwhile, her best friend Agatha, who isn't stereotypically 
pretty and withdrawn, is deemed the perfect candidate for the School for Evil. On the night of the kidnapping, both girls are kidnapped but are seemingly sent go the "wrong" schools: Sophie to the School for Evil and Agatha to the School for Good. Soon after, Sophie becomes smitten with King Arthur's son, Tedros of Camelot, who also takes notice of her. Agatha, however, only wants to go home; she and Sophie ask the School Master to go home, but the Storian begins their fairy tale. He tells them they must follow it and give them a riddle to solve; the answer is true love's kiss.

Sophie must kiss Tedros to prove they are in the wrong schools and go home; he denies her, however, after she refuses to save him out of selfishness. Sophie becomes bitter and learns Agatha is her nemesis, whom she must kill to be happy. Sophie loses her beauty and attacks the schools when Tedros asks Agatha to be his princess.  During the battle, Sophie learns the School Master is Evil, and the Storian is atoning him for the murder of his brother. He believes that Sophie is his true love, and her kiss will restore Evil's glory. However, Sophie denies him and sacrifices herself to save Agatha, who kisses her, reviving her. The two return home, ending their fairy tale while Tedros is left alone.

==== A World Without Princes (2014) ====

Agatha and Sophie have settled back into their old lives in Gavaldon. Agatha misses Tedros and secretly wishes for him. This triggers a wave of mysterious attacks on Sophie, which threaten the entire village and cause the two girls to be run out of town. They make their way to the School for Good and Evil, only to find it has become the School for Girls and Boys. At the School for Boys, Tedros is seeking revenge upon Sophie for supposedly stealing his true love. At the School for Girls, former Evil history teacher Evelyn Sader, who was banned from the schools years before and believed she was the School Master's true love, is now Dean. After Agatha kisses Tedros, Sophie is almost sent back to Gavaldon. However, Sader tricks Sophie into kissing the School Master using a piece of his soul he placed in her before she was exiled. The School Master is then revived and kills Sader. Agatha and Tedros are returned to Gavaldon, with the fate of Sophie  and the Endless Woods unclear.

==== The Last Ever After (2015) ====

In the wake of Sophie and the School Master's kiss, Evil has been shown capable of love, and all the previous fairy tale villains are given a second chance. They quickly hunt down their heroes and murder them, weakening the shield between the world of Readers and the world of fairytales, threatening the existence of both. With the shield weakening, the sun begins to melt. After leaving Gavaldon, Agatha and Tedros rescue Sophie and recover Excalibur, which they need to destroy a ring Rafal (the School Master) gave Sophie that transforms her soul into the deepest Evil and keeps him immortal. Sophie refuses and returns to Rafal; the two sides begin to prepare for a war on the night the sun will melt completely. During the war, another hero is killed, and the shield between Gavaldon and the Woods disappears. However, when all hope is lost, Agatha convinces Sophie to destroy her ring, killing Rafal. Afterwards, Sophie becomes the Dean of the School for Evil, feeling content with her new life; Agatha and Tedros arrive at Camelot, seeking to restore it to its former glory.

The Camelot Years
Three books in the series school for good and evil which focuses on a new adventure featuring new and old characters, but a much more evil villain. The books included in the Camelot years are Quests for Glory, a Crystal of Time, and One True King.

Quests for Glory (2017)

The students at the School for Good and Evil set out on their required fourth-year quests. For their quests, Agatha and Tedros must try and return Camelot to its former splendor as queen and king. For her quest, Dean Sophie seeks to mold Evil in her own image. When a mysterious villain known as "the Snake" emerges, terrorizing the land the old friends must work together to save the Endless Woods.

A Crystal of Time (2019)
A false king has claimed the throne of Camelot, sentenced Tedros to death, and forced Sophie to be his queen. Only Agatha manages to escape. Agatha and the students at the School for Good and Evil must find a way to restore Tedros to his throne and save Camelot, before all of their fairy tales come to a lethal end.

One True King (2020)

 To prove he is the true King of Camelot, Tedros must pass three tests set by his late father King Arthur. Pitted against him is the pretender king Rhian, who has all of the Woods on his side. Staying undercover, Tedros travels the Endless Woods with Agatha, Sophie, and his friends from the School for Good & Evil, in a race to pass his father's tests and save the Endless Woods from Japeth's domination.

Prequel series

Rise of the School for Good and Evil (2022)
The twin School Masters, Rafal and Rhian, have ruled the School for Good and Evil for many years in harmony. After a streak of Good victories, however, Rafal, the Evil School Master decides to try and even the scales. The attempts drive the brothers apart, creating a rift that threatens the balance of Good and Evil in the Endless Woods. Released in 2022.

Fall of the School for Good and Evil (2023) 
The upcoming sequel and conclusion to Rise of the School for Good and Evil, coming May 2023.

Conception 
When Soman Chainani was younger, he did not have access to cable, the Internet, or video games; he only had a TV and VHS tapes of Walt Disney Animation Studios's films, many of which were based on classic fairy tales. At university, the difference between the original stories and Disney's versions captivated him when he took a class about the history of fairy tales.

Chainani first began working on The School for Good and Evil in June 2010. Revisions, retellings, and mash-ups of fairy tales had gained popularity at the time. Works often included several cliches that had heavily influenced the portrayals Good and Evil, Boys and Girls, and Old and Young, as well as tropes that recurred in the portrayal of antagonists. Chainani, however, he had wanted to focus on something more primal: a brand-new fairy tale that was "just as unleashed and unhinged" as the older tales that would redevelop the fairy tale genre while acknowledging its past—he aimed to dispel these stereotypes and deliver an original tale devoid of cliches by creating his own series.

Chainani initially planned the series as three trilogies: The School Years, The Camelot Years, and The New Class.

Publication
When he first began working on The School for Good and Evil, Chainani expected it to become a treatment for a screenplay he could sell. He later realized, however, that "it had to be novels". Producer Jane Startz, who Chainani worked with on an adaptation of The Pushcart War, agreed with this sentiment, quashing any doubt Chainani had. Startz negotiated the deal for the trilogy with publishing company HarperCollins after that. According to its editorial director—Phoebe Yeh—she "knew in [her] gut that [the company] were going to have a winner" from the novel's first sentence, being "blown away" by the originality, premise, characters, lore, and language. Yeh's enjoyment encouraged her to acquire the trilogy from Startz.

The School for Good and Evil was first published on May 14, 2013, in a 150,000-copy printing. In the United Kingdom, it was released on June 6 of the same year. The second novel, A World Without Princes, was published on April 15, 2014, while the third, The Last Ever After, was published a year later on July 21. This was followed by the release of the fourth and fifth books—Quests for Glory and A Crystal of Time—on September 19, 2017, and March 5, 2019, respectively. HarperCollins published final novel, One True King, on June 2, 2020.

Reception

Critical reception for the first book in the series has been positive, and the book has received praise from The Guardian and the Miami Herald.

Awards
 Waterstone's Children's Book Prize for Best Fiction for 5-12 (2014, nominee for The School for Good and Evil)

Impact
The School for Good and Evil has amassed a significant international fan following. As of 2022, the series has been translated into over 32 languages and sold more than 3.5 million copies worldwide. According to Vogue India, the series has become a "mainstay" on The New York Times Best Seller list.

Adaptation

Shortly after the first book's publication, Universal Pictures acquired rights to adapt the first novel into film. In 2020, Netflix announced it would take over and release a film adaptation of the novel, directed by Paul Feig. Sophia Anne Caruso and Sofia Wylie were cast in the lead roles in December 2020. In addition, Charlize Theron, Kerry Washington, Laurence Fishburne and Michelle Yeoh all have supporting roles in the film. On March 19, 2021, it was announced that Jamie Flatters would play Tedros and Kit Young would play Rafal. On March 24, 2021, it was revealed that Earl Cave will play Hort. Filming took place at The Belfast Harbour Studios in Northern Ireland. The adaptation was released in 2022, debuting at #1 on Netflix in over 80 countries.

References

External links
 
 Princess Not-So-Charming at Harvard Magazine

 
2010s fantasy novels
American children's novels
American fantasy novel series
Children's fantasy novels
Hexalogies
Novels based on fairy tales
Novels set in schools
Series of children's books